Darreh Zagheh may refer to:
Darreh Zagheh-ye Bala